Kutrigurs were Turkic nomadic equestrians who flourished on the Pontic–Caspian steppe in the 6th century AD. To their east were the similar Utigurs and both possibly were closely related to the Bulgars. They warred with the Byzantine Empire and the Utigurs. Towards the end of the 6th century they were absorbed by the Pannonian Avars under pressure from the Turks.

Etymology
The name Kutrigur, also recorded as Kwrtrgr, Κουτρίγουροι, Κουτούργουροι, Κοτρίγουροι, Κοτρίγοροι, Κουτρίγοροι, Κοτράγηροι, Κουτράγουροι, Κοτριαγήροι, has been suggested as a metathecized form of Turkic *Toqur-Oğur, with *quturoğur meaning "nine Oğur (tribes)". David Marshall Lang derived it from Turkic kötrügür (conspicuous, eminent, renowned). Few scholars support theories deriving the Kutrigurs from the Guti/Quti and the Utigurs from the Udi/Uti, of ancient Southwest Asia and the Caucasus respectively, posited by Osman Karatay. Similarly few find Duč'i which is a term for the Bulgars (some read Kuchi) as a root of Kutrigur, posited by Josef Markwart.

History
Grousset thought that the Kutrigurs were remnants of the Huns, Procopius recounts: They occupied the Tanaitic-Maeotic (Don-Azov) steppe zone, the Kutrigurs in the Western part and the Utrigurs towards the East.

This story was also confirmed by the words of the Utigur ruler Sandilch:

The Syriac translation of Pseudo-Zacharias Rhetor's Ecclesiastical History ( 555) in Western Eurasia records thirteen tribes, the wngwr (Onogur), wgr (Oğur), sbr (Sabir), bwrgr (Burğar, i.e. Bulgars), kwrtrgr (Kutriğurs), br (probably Abar, i.e. Avars), ksr (Kasr; Akatziri?), srwrgwr (Saragur), dyrmr (*[I]di[r]mar? < Ιτιμαροι), b'grsyq (Bagrasik, i.e. Barsils), kwls (Khalyzians?), bdl (Abdali?), and ftlyt (Hephthalite). They are described in typical phrases used for nomads in the ethnographic literature of the period, as people who "live in tents, earn their living on the meat of livestock and fish, of wild animals and by their weapons (plunder)".

War with the Byzantines

Agathias ( 579–582) wrote:{{bquote|...all of them are called in general Scythians and Huns in particular according to their nation. Thus, some are Koutrigours or Outigours and yet others are Oultizurs and Bourougounds... the Oultizurs and Bourougounds were known up to the time of the Emperor Leo (457–474) and the Romans of that time and appeared to have been strong. We, however, in this day, neither know them, nor, I think, will we. Perhaps, they have perished or perhaps they have moved off to very far place.}}

In 551, a 12,000-strong Kutrigur army led by many commanders, including Chinialon, came from the "western side of the Maeotic Lake" to assist the Gepids who were at the war with the Lombards. Later, with the Gepids, they plundered the Byzantine lands. Emperor Justinian I (527–565) through diplomatic persuasion and bribery tricked the Kutrigurs and Utigurs into mutual warfare. Utigurs led by Sandilch attacked the Kutrigurs, who suffered great losses.

Kutrigurs made a peace treaty with the Byzantine Empire, and 2,000 Kutrigurs on horseback, with wives and children, led by Sinnion, entered imperial service and were settled in Thrace. The friendly treatment of those Kutrigurs was viewed negatively by Sandilch.

In the winter of 558, the remaining large Kutrigur army led by Zabergan crossed the frozen Danube and divided into three sections; one raided south as far as Thermopylae; while two others the Thracian Chersonesus; and the periphery of Constantinople. In March 559 Zabergan attacked Constantinople; one part of his forces consisted of 7,000 horsemen. The transit of such distances in a short period of time shows that they were mounted warriors, and compared to the Chinialon's army, Zabergan's raiders were already encamped near the banks of the Danube.

A threat to the stability of the Byzantine Empire according to Procopius, Agathias and Menander, the Kutrigurs and Utigurs decimated one another. Some Kutrigur remnants were swept away by the Avars to Pannonia. By 569 the Κοτζαγηροί (Kotzagiroi, possibly Kutrigurs), Ταρνιάχ (Tarniach) and Ζαβενδὲρ (Zabender) fled to the Avars from the Türks. Avar Khagan Bayan I in 568 ordered 10,000 so-called Kutrigur Huns to cross the Sava river. The Utigurs remained in the Pontic steppe and fell under the rule of the Türks.

Between 630 and 635, Khan Kubrat managed to unite the Onogur Bulgars with the tribes of the Kutrigurs and Utigurs under a single rule, creating a powerful confederation which was referred to by the medieval authors in Western Europe as Old Great Bulgaria, or Patria Onoguria''. According to some scholars, it is more correctly called the Onogundur-Bulgar Empire.

See also
 Utigurs
 Onogurs
 Bulgars

Notes

References

Sources
 
 
 
 
 
 
 
 
 
 
 

 
Turkic peoples of Europe
6th century
Extinct Turkic peoples